Újpesti Munkásképző Torna Egyesület was a Hungarian football club from the town of Újpest, Budapest, Hungary.

History
Újpesti Munkásképző Torna Egyesület debuted in the 1945–46 season of the Hungarian League and finished eleventh.

Name Changes 
1912–1939: Újpesti Munkásképző Torna Egyesület
1939–1944: Újpesti MSE
1944: dissolved due to political reasons
1945–1949: Újpesti Munkásképző Torna Egyesület
1949: merger with Wolfner SE as Bőripari Dolgozók SE
1957: reestablished
1957–?: Újpesti MTE

References

External links
 Profile

Football clubs in Hungary
Defunct football clubs in Hungary
1920 establishments in Hungary